Harold Green, Jr. (born January 29, 1968), is an American former professional football player who was a running back in the National Football League (NFL). He was selected by the Cincinnati Bengals in the 2nd round of the 1990 NFL Draft. He attended Stratford High School in Goose Creek, SC. A 6'2", 222-lb running back, he played for the University of South Carolina, where he rushed for 2,617 yards, caught 76 passes for 661 yards, and scored 26 touchdowns in three seasons.

Green played nine NFL seasons from 1990 to 1998. His best year as a pro came during the 1992 season as a member of the Bengals, rushing for 1,170 yards with 41 receptions. However, in 1993 Green averaged just 2.74 yards per carry, which is the record for lowest yards per carry among running backs with more than 200 rushing attempts in a season.

NFL career statistics

References

1968 births
Living people
Players of American football from South Carolina
American football running backs
South Carolina Gamecocks football players
Cincinnati Bengals players
St. Louis Rams players
Atlanta Falcons players
American Conference Pro Bowl players
People from Ladson, South Carolina